Franz Xaver Schnyder von Wartensee (18 April 1786 – 27 August 1868) was a Swiss-born composer, teacher of composition and writer on music, resident in Frankfurt-am-Main for most of his career.

Life
He was born in Lucerne; his father Jost Schnyder von Wartensee was an upper-class citizen of Lucerne, holding high offices including grand councillor.

Until 1810 he had no musical teaching but what he could get from books and practice. He returned to Switzerland in 1812 and devoted himself to composition until 1815, when he became teacher in the Pestalozzi institute at Yverdun.

In 1817 he settled in Frankfurt-am-Main, and lived there as teacher of composition and director of various musical institutions until his death on 30 August 1868. During this latter period he was highly regarded as a teacher, and had many pupils, among them the English composer Robert Lucas de Pearsall.

He married in 1814 Karoline von Hertenstein (died 1827), and in 1847 Josephine Jahn.

George Grove wrote: "Schnyder appears to have been a man of exceptional ability, but his life was too desultory to admit of his leaving anything of permanent value, and there was always a strong amateur element about him."

Works
His compositions include an opera Fortunatus (1829) and an oratorio Zeit und Ewigkeit (1838) — both brought to performance, and the opera to publication; symphonies, which were played in Frankfurt; solo and part-songs. He wrote much, both poetry and prose, and many of his articles on musical subjects were contributed to Allgemeine musikalische Zeitung and Cæcilia.

References

Attribution

External links

 

1786 births
1868 deaths
People from Lucerne
Swiss classical composers